The 2014–15 Welsh League Cup was the 23rd season of the Welsh League Cup, which was established in 1992. The twelve teams from the Welsh Premier League entered, along with fifteen from other divisions in the Welsh pyramid and one from England's Southern Football League Division One South & West. Four teams were given a bye into the Second Round. The New Saints won the competition for the sixth time after defeating Bala Town with 3–0 in the final.

First round
The matches were played on 11, 13, 16, 18, 19, 20 August and 9 September 2014.

|-

|-

|-

|-

|-

|-

|-

|}

Second round
The matches were played on 2, 3, 10 and 17 September 2014.

|-

|-

|-

|-

|}

Third round
The matches were played on 23 and 24 September 2014.

|-

|-

|}

Semi-finals
The matches were played on 18 November 2014.

|}

Final
The match was played on Sunday 25 January 2015 at Latham Park.

References

External links

2014–15 Welsh League Cup results

Welsh League Cup seasons
League Cup
Wales